Titoni Ltd. is a Swiss watchmaker that was founded in 1919 by Fritz Schluep in the Swiss town of Grenchen. The company, which is now owned by the third generation of its founding family, currently employs around 60 people.

The company is now an active member of the Federation of the Swiss Watch Industry (FH).

History 
Titoni was originally known as the Felco Watch Company and manufactured wristwatches under the namesake brand. In 1943, the Felca name was launched and replaced the original Felco trademark. After 1952, the Felca Watch Company's line of watches were marketed under two separate brands: Felca (the main brand) and Titoni (special marque developed for the Asian (mostly China) market with the plum blossom as its logo). The Felca name continued its existence until 1982 when the inaugurated third generation, led by Daniel Schluep, decided to transform the company's identity as a result of its success with the Titoni marque. Since then, all watches produced by the firm use the name Titoni as they are known today.

In 2019, Titoni celebrated its 100th anniversary with a technical achievement of successfully developing the new inhouse automatic-winding caliber T10.

In 2022, it was said that two fourth-generation members of the Schluep family, Marc Schluep and Olivier Schluep, would succeed the leadership position of the current CEO Daniel Schluep.

Global operation 
Titoni has actively presented itself in China since 1959, and this country remains Titoni's main market to the present day. Titoni watches has also been available in other Asian countries via a network of official dealers.

Products and marketing position 

Titoni manufactures watches in the entry-level luxury segment and competes with companies such as Doxa, Edox, Ball and Maurice Lacroix, who also marketing their products in the same category. Most of the brand's timepieces are equipped with outsourced ETA and Sellita movements, except several recent series and limited editions powered by the new inhouse T10 movement developed by its own engineering bureau.

Notable collections 
Note: Collections in bold are equipped with the inhouse T10 movement.

Line 1919 - Titoni's latest series released in 2019 as part of the brand's 100th anniversary celebration.
Seascoper
Master Series - Titoni's line of premium watches with highly modified, COSC-certified ETA/Sellita movements. Before the introduction of the Line 1919 collection, it was the flagship series of all Titoni watches.
Airmaster - Titoni's iconic, most well-known collection introduced in the 1960s.

References 

Watch manufacturing companies of Switzerland
Companies based in the canton of Solothurn
Grenchen
Swiss watch brands
Luxury